Lee, Dong Youb is a contemporary art painter in South Korea. As one of artists leading Korean Abstract Painting, he has developed his own philosophy about what contemporary art can propose after Post-modernism. The main subjects of his work are mutual relationship, cycling resonance and dynamic condition between original being and the environment. He suggests consistently that the distance or emptiness makes being exist and that there is no clear boundary anywhere.

Life
Born in 1946, Lee Dong Youb graduated from Hong-Ik University and the graduate school. He got married with Lee Hye-Ran, the founder of Seoul Gallery where he held the first solo exhibition, in 1977. He has had solo exhibitions more than ten times such as in Seoul and Tokyo. He has participated in many group exhibitions in Japan, Seoul, New York, and Paris including the first `Independent' exhibition which sponsored by Korean Fine Arts Association. He lives in Seoul with his family.

Work
He gives effort to show extremely expressing formality about white color and air through work. His work is far, broad, deep, and difficult because he has pursued the echo of cosmic perception from his early days. Bokijae of ancient times determined anonymous sky and ground as source of recognition, and made basic symbol emblem as drawing a line in the sky of empty like Taegeuk of  national flag of Korea. He has employed his artistic indication from attitude, which conveys the representative symbol of quickening perfection from vibration of Biui, which has conceived from the ancient times. Therefore, his early works of 10 years ago occurred extraordinary attention which has kept until now.

Lew, June Sang (art critic, former chief curator of National Museum of Contemporary Art of Korea):
When I said that "The vertical axis is vibrating delicately," I said so because since the drawn contours of vertical shapes are standing in a minor grading of shade and shadow, a phenomenon can be perceived in which the vertical steel, when struck, shakes to the left and the right for a while producing some lingering sounds in the wake.

Yusuke NAKAHARA (art critic): His works are typified by the annihilation of objects. In the works in which he painted a glass or one with ice floating in it, the outline of the objects was quite clear, but the outlines have gradually begun to disappear, and in his recent works the delineation of objects has been reduced to the point where only a suggestion of their existence remains. Rather than calling it a form, it is perhaps more proper to speak about in on the level of a momentary phenomenon. Moreover, as we feel it moving away into the distance out of our world of sight, it returns to the matrix white.

Kim Mikyung (Prof. Kangnam Univ. Art History): Lee Dong-Yeop debuted at the First Independents Exhibition (1972) with paintings of semi-transparent cups against a white background. At the FIVE HINSEK show, he presented images of melting cups on neutral-colored canvases. What his paintings address wasn't the problem of white tone per se, but rather: 'if the cup is a container of the universe, ice is the existence in it; through depicting the processes of melting and evaporation of ice and the resulting emptiness, the painting suggests the fungible or inconstant nature of things. Nonetheless, the indistinct white-toned background was already there in all of his paintings, and the Japanese organizers paid attention to this aspect of his work.

Exhibitions

Solo exhibitions
 2008  Hak-go-jae, Seoul
 2008  Leeahn Gallery, Daegu
 2005  Tong-In Auction Gallery, Seoul
 2003  CAIS Gallery, Seoul
 2002  Gallery M, Daegu
 2000  Gallery Bhak, Seoul
 1993  Haenan-Kent Gallery, New York, USA
 1992  Koart Gallery, Seoul
 1988  Saem Gallery, Seoul
 1985  Yoon Gallery, Seoul
 1983  Space Gallery, Seoul
 1977  Seoul Gallery, Seoul
 1977  Mura Matsu Gallery, Tokyo, Japan

Group exhibitions (selected)
 2008  Inter-viewing Paintings: the Interface between Eastern-style paintings and Western-style paintings in South Korea, SOMA museum of art, Seoul
 2007  Hommage 100: Korean Contemporary Art 1970-2007, Korea Art Center, Busan
 2007  Korea International Art Fair, COEX, Korea
 2006  100 Years of Korean Art - Part 2: Tradition, Human, Art, Reality, National Museum of Contemporary Art, Korea
 2002  Re-reading of Korean Contemporary Art III; Critical Reviews of 70's Monochrome Paintings, Hanwon Museum of Art, Seoul
 2000  The Nature, Posco Museum, Seoul
 2000  Trace-Eternal Trace and Pure Surface, CAIS Gallery, Seoul
 2000  Gwangju Biennale Special Exhibition - Aspect of Contemporary Korean-Japan Art, Gwangju
 1997  Korean Art 97 - Humanism · Animalism · Mechanism, National Museum of Contemporary Art, Korea
 1996  Korean Monochrome Painting in the 1970s, Gallery Hyundae, Seoul
 1993  12 Contemporary Artists from Korea, Miyagi Museum, Japan
 1991  A Grouping for the Identity of Contemporary Korean Art III, Hanwon Museum, Seoul
 1990  Seoul Art Fair, Hoam Gallery, Seoul
 1987  Black & White in Korean Contemporary Art, National Museum of Contemporary Art, Korea
 1986  Pastel Contemporain Coreen, Culturel Centre de Coreen, Paris, France
 1986  Korean Contemporary Arts, Galleries National de Grand Palais, Paris
 1986  86' ASIA Contemporary Art Exhibition, National Museum of Modern Art, Seoul
 1984  The 3rd Human Document 84/85, Tokyo Gallery, Tokyo, Japan
 1984  Korean Contemporary Art Exhibition, Taipei Fine Art Museum, Taiwan
 1984  Exposition de La Peinture Blanche, Centre Culturel Francais de Seoul, Seoul
 1983  Korean Contemporary Art Exhibition- "The Latter Half of the 70's - An Aspect", Tokyo Metropolitan Art Museum / Museum of Modern Art / The National Museum of International Art, Osaka / The Museum of Modern Art Hokkaido, Sapporo / The Fukuoka Art Museum, Fukuoka, Japan
 1983          Korea New Paper Works, Spring Gallery, China
 1982  The Phase of Korean Contemporary Art, Tokyo Art Museum, Japan
 1982          The Contemporary Formative Exhibition of Paper of Korea & Japan, National Museum of Modern Art, Seoul in Korea and Kyoto in Japan
 1982          The Contemporary Artists Print & Drawing Exhibition, Myung-Dong Gallery, Seoul
 1981  Drawing 81, National Museum of Art, Seoul
 1981          Young Artists Exhibition, National Museum of Art, Seoul
 1981          Korean Drawing Now, Brooklyn Museum, New York, USA
 1980  The 36 Contemporary Artists, Kwan-Hoon Gallery, Seoul
 1980          Asian Contemporary Art Festival, Fukuoka Art Museum, Japan
 1980          Grand Exhibition of Korean Prints & Drawings, National Museum of Art, Seoul
 1980          Union Exhibition of Korean Contemporary Art (Origin Association & Korean Contemporary Sculpture Association), Kwan-Hoon Gallery, Seoul
 1980          ASIA Contemporary Art Exhibition, Taipei, Taiwan
 1979  Korean Arts Methods of Today, Fine Art Center Gallery, Seoul
 1979          Union Exhibition of Art Groups, National Museum of Art, Seoul
 1978  The Trend for the Past 20 Years in Korean Contemporary Arts, National Museum of Modern Art, Seoul
 1978          Korean Contemporary Painting & Sculpture Exhibition, National Museum of Art, Seoul
 1978          Work on Paper, Kyun-Ji Gallery, Seoul
 1977  Korea Facet of Contemporary Art, Tokyo Central Museum, Japan
 1977          Korea-China Contemporary Art, National Museum of History, Taipei, Taiwan
 1976-1984  Origin Group Show, Seoul
 1976  Invited Exhibition of 5 Korean Contemporary Artists, Seoul Gallery, Seoul
 1975-1985  Ecole de Seoul, Seoul
 1975  Korea Five Artists - Hinsek(White), Tokyo Gallery, Japan
 1974  The 6th International Painting Festival, Cagness, France
 1973  Korean Contemporary Art 1957-1972 Abstraction: Situation Plastiqiue & Anti-Plastique, Myoung-Dong Gallery
 1972  The 1st Independents, Seoul

Museum collections
 Tokyo National Museum of Modern Art, Japan
 National Museum of Modern and Contemporary Art, Seoul/Guacheon
 Seoul Museum of Art (SeMA), Seoul 
 The Ho-Am Art Museum, Seoul
 The Museum of Hong-Ik University, Seoul
 Busan Metropolitan Museum of Art, Busan
 Sunggok Art Museum, Seoul
 POSCO Museum, Seoul
 Hakgojae, Seoul

Awards
 1980  Grand Prize at the 7th Korean Fine Art Grand Prize Exhibition, Hankuk Ilbo, Seoul
 1978  Special Selection at the 1st Grand Exhibition, Joongang Ilbo, Seoul
 1978  Excellent Frontier Prize at the 5th Grand Exhibition of Korean Fine Arts, Hankuk Ilbo, Seoul
 1974  Prize at the 6th Cagness International Painting Festival, Cagness, France
 1972  Grand Prize at the 1st Independents, Korean Fine Arts Association, Seoul

See also
 Ontology
 cycle
 Void
 White space
 Zen
 Taoism
 Minimalism
 Monochrome painting
 Abstract expressionism
 Monoha
 Lee U-Fan

External links
 Official website, InterWhite
 ARKO(The Arts Council Korea)'s 500 Artists: Lee Dong Youb

Contemporary painters
South Korean painters
Living people
1946 births
Place of birth missing (living people)